This article details the Bradford Bulls rugby league football club's 2017 season. This is the Bulls 3rd season in the Championship. They come into this season as Championship Shield winners after defeating the Sheffield Eagles 27-16 in the Championship Shield Final.

Season review

August 2016

It was announced that French international Jean-Philippe Baile left the Bulls by mutual consent after playing just one game in the 2016 season.During the same week, newly formed League 1 side Toronto Wolfpack signed Bulls  Dan Fleming on a one-year contract. Tongan winger Etu Uaisele also left Bradford after being sent on loan to Dewsbury Rams, he returned home to Australia following his release. Fullback Richie Mathers announced his retirement shortly after the defeat by Dewsbury Rams. Super League side Warrington Wolves signed Bradford centre and former player Matty Blythe on a one-year deal. Captain Adrian Purtell announced that he would join the London Broncos on a two-year deal, shortly after second rower Jay Pitts joined the departing Purtell to join London. Veteran prop forward Rhys Lovegrove announced his retirement from the sport after suffering from a recurring head injury, he joined the backroom staff. The first signings for the 2017 season came in the form of London trio; winger Ilies Macani, centre Alex Foster and prop forward Jon Magrin, all on two year deals. Towards the end of the month the Bulls announced that former academy graduate and club legend Leon Pryce would be returning on a one-year deal in order to finish his career at the Bradford Bulls.

September 2016

Lucas Walshaw made his loan deal at Dewsbury Rams into a permanent one by signing a two-year contract. Wakefield Trinity Wildcats centre/second row Jason Walton became the 5th signing for the 2017 season by putting pen to paper on a two-year deal at the Bulls. Bradford born prop forward Ross Peltier signed a two-year deal with the Bulls from local side Keighley Cougars.

October 2016

Long serving academy loose forward Danny Addy and New Zealand prop forward Mitch Clark both signed one year deals at Hull Kingston Rovers. Due to Hull KR's relegation both of their contracts were voided and had the option to re-sign for the Bulls, however both decided to honor their contracts with the Hull side. Ex-Bradford player Phil Joseph signed a two-year deal to rejoin the club after a lack of game time at Salford Red Devils, shortly after the Bulls announced the signing of Australian loose forward Lachlan Burr from the Gold Coast Titans on a one-year deal. Bradford were due to sign Manly Sea Eagles forward Blake Leary however negotiations fell through at the vital point of talks.

November 2016

Second-row forward Kurt Haggerty retired from playing rugby league to further his coaching career, he signed on the backroom staff for new Canadian side Toronto Wolfpack.. Second rower Tom Olbison also signed a one-year extension to his contract. Prop forward Steve Crossley announced that he had signed for Toronto for the upcoming season. Huddersfield Giants announced the signing of prop Paul Clough from the Bulls, in addition to this stand off Lee Gaskell signed a 4-year deal with the Giants. During this month, owner Marc Green placed the club in administration for the third time in 4 years due to outstanding tax owed to HMRC. Meanwhile, Huddersfield announced the signing of Dale Ferguson from the Bulls on a two-year deal.

December 2016

Due to the club being in administration, no signings were made in December. According to the administrator there were a number of bids for the club include a couple from multi-millionaires hoping to invest in Odsal Stadium and its surrounding lands. However non of these were successful.

January 2017

The administrators announced that two last minute bids were unsuccessful and therefore the club was liquidated. Following this news, winger James Clare signed for Leigh Centurions on a two-year deal. This sparked an exodus at Odsal as players became free agents. Academy products Tom Olbison, Alex Mellor and Adam O'Brien all signed with Super League clubs as Olbison joined Widnes Vikings with Mellor and O'Brien joining the Huddersfield Giants on long term deals. Top try scorer Kris Welham attracted numerous offers before settling on Salford Red Devils and second rower Jason Walton signed with RFL Championship side Featherstone Rovers. Superstar fullback Kieren Moss and prop Ben Kavanagh also signed for Hull Kingston Rovers. The Rugby Football League (RFL) accepted a bid to found a new club in Bradford. It was announced that Andrew Chalmers and a former Wigan Warriors coach, Graham Lowe, were the successful new owners. They immediately signed veteran halfback Leon Pryce and released coach Rohan Smith. In addition to this they declined to offer Aussie halfback Dane Chisholm a contract with the new club. During the owners press conference they revealed that Manly Sea Eagles legend Geoff Toovey would become the Bulls new coach for the 2017 season, in addition to this Leon Pryce was revealed as the captain. Australian second rower Lachlan Burr signed for Leigh Centurions. The Bulls re-signed the rest of the off contract players. With a makeshift side the Bulls lost 10-28 to a strong Huddersfield Giants side with Joe Keyes and Ross Oakes scoring for Bradford, Keyes kicked a conversion. Second-row forward Colton Roche put pen to paper on a deal to join the Bulls for the 2017 season from York City Knights. In the final pre-season match, Bradford narrowly lost 24-25 to League 1 side Keighley Cougars. New signing Roche scored the opening try before young hooker Joe Lumb scored. Oakes carried on from the previous week and scored whilst Iliess Macani also went over for a try, Keyes kicked three goals and Oscar Thomas kicked a conversion. Squad numbers were released at the end of the month, with Pryce receiving the number 6 shirt.

February 2017

Reinforces were made to the squad as Leeds Rhinos loaned out halfback Jordan Lilley, second row Josh Jordan-Roberts, hooker Sam Hallas and prop Mikolaj Oledzki on a 1-month loans to the Bulls ahead of the opening game. The opening game of the season saw the Bulls lose 24-54 to RFL Championship favourites Hull Kingston Rovers. The Bulls took an early lead through young prop Liam Kirk before Hull KR scored a few tries to take the lead. Academy graduate Ross Oakes also scored before fan favourite Ethan Ryan raced 80m to score an interception try ten minutes from full-time. Iliess Macani scored a consolation try after a Jordan Lilley intercept whilst fullback Oscar Thomas kicked four conversions. Following the defeat the Bulls announced the capture of young Samoan rugby sevens star Phoenix Hunapo-Nofoa on a 1-year deal. The first home game of the season saw 4,051 people watch the Bulls narrowly lose 14-22 to  the Rochdale Hornets. Youngster James Bentley and Thomas both scored tries whilst Thomas kicked 3 goals in the defeat. After being out powered in the pack the Bulls announced the signing of French international, second row forward Kevin Larroyer on a 1-month loan deal from Castleford Tigers. Bradford added more experience signing ex-international Scott Moore on a 4-game trial and also utility back Lee Smith on a 2-year deal.

Milestones

Round 1: Iliess Macani, Colton Roche, Jon Magrin, Ross Peltier, Brandan Wilkinson, Jordan Lilley, Sam Hallas, Josh Jordan-Roberts and Mikolaj Oledzki all made their debuts for the Bulls.
Round 1: Leon Pryce made his debut in his second stint with the Bulls.
Round 1: Iliess Macani and Liam Kirk scored their 1st tries for the Bulls.
Round 2: James Bentley scored his 1st try for the Bulls.
Round 3: Kevin Larroyer and Scott Moore made their debuts for the Bulls.
Round 3: Ethan Ryan scored his 3rd hat-trick for the Bulls.
Round 4: Lee Smith and Daniel Murray made their debuts for the Bulls.
Round 4: Scott Moore scored his 1st try for the Bulls.
Round 5: Kevin Larroyer and Colton Roche scored their 1st tries for the Bulls.
CCR4: Evan Hodgson and Reiss Butterworth made their debuts for the Bulls.
CCR4: Evan Hodgson scored his 1st try for the Bulls.
CCR4: Joe Keyes kicked his 1st drop goal for the Bulls.
Round 7: Lee Smith, Daniel Murray, Jon Magrin and Brandan Wilkinson scored their 1st tries for the Bulls.
Round 7: Jordan Lilley kicked his 1st goal for the Bulls.
Round 9: James Davies made his debut for the Bulls.
Round 9: James Bentley scored his 1st four-try haul and 1st hat-trick for the Bulls.
Round 9: Oscar Thomas reached 100 points for the Bulls.
Round 10: Ethan Ryan scored his 25th try and reached 100 points for the Bulls.
Round 11: Keenan Tomlinson made his debut for the Bulls.
Round 12: Brandon Pickersgill and Matthew Storton made their debuts for the Bulls.
Round 12: James Davies scored his 1st try for the Bulls.
Round 13: Ted Chapelhow and Sam Brooks made their debut for the Bulls.
Round 14: Cameron Smith made his debut for the Bulls.
Round 14: Cameron Smith scored his 1st try for the Bulls.
Round 15: Dane Chisholm made his debut in his second stint at the Bulls.
Round 15: Dane Chisholm scored his 1st try and kicked his 1st drop goal in his second stint at the Bulls.
Round 18: Ed Chamberlain made his debut for the Bulls.
Round 18: Ted Chapelhow scored his 1st try for the Bulls.
Round 19: Ethan Ryan scored his 1st four-try haul and 4th hat-trick for the Bulls.
Round 19: Ed Chamberlain scored his 1st try for the Bulls.
Round 20: Ashley Gibson made his debut for the Bulls.
Round 20: Vila Halafihi scored his 1st try for the Bulls.
Round 21: Damian Sironen and Cory Aston made their debut for the Bulls.
Round 21: Cory Aston scored his 1st try for the Bulls.
Round 23: Willie Tonga made his debut for the Bulls.
Round 23: Damian Sironen scored his 1st try for the Bulls.
Round 23: Cory Aston kicked his 1st goal for the Bulls.
Championship Shield Game 1: Ross Peltier scored his 1st try for the Bulls.
Championship Shield Game 1: Lee Smith kicked his 1st goal for the Bulls.
Championship Shield Game 2: Josh Rickett scored his 1st try for the Bulls.
Championship Shield Game 3: Sam Hallas and Mikolaj Oledzki scored their 1st try for the Bulls.
Championship Shield Game 5: Omari Caro scored his 4th hat-trick for the Bulls.

Pre-season friendlies

Bulls score is first.

Player appearances
Friendly games only

 = Injured

 = Suspended

Fixtures and results

2017 Championship

2017 Championship Shield

Player appearances
Championship only

 = Injured

 = Suspended

Challenge Cup

Player appearances
Challenge Cup games only

Squad statistics

 Appearances and points include (Super League, Challenge Cup and Play-offs) as of 17 September 2017.

 = Injured
 = Suspended

Transfers

In

Out

References

External links

2017 in rugby league by club
2017 in English rugby league
Bradford Bulls seasons